Manningtree High School is a secondary school with academy status in Lawford, Manningtree, Essex, England. The school has specialist status in Science. The headteacher is Mrs Morris. The school have recently added a "Multi Use Games Area" (all weather pitch) on the field.

See also
Secondary schools in Essex

References

External links
 School website

Secondary schools in Essex
Academies in Essex
Manningtree
Specialist science colleges in England